Lee Kil-Hoon or Lee Gil-hoon (born March 6, 1983) is a South Korean footballer as a midfielder, who currently plays for Malaysia Premier League club Sabah FA.

Club career
In 2006, Lee joined K-League side Suwon Samsung Bluewings. Lee then transferred to Gwangju Sangmu before return to Suwon in 2009. Lee played his last season for the club before joining Busan I'Park in 2010. In 2012, Lee transferred to Chinese side, Hohhot Dongjin before joining another Chinese club, Guizhou Zhicheng in 2013. Lee then played in Hong Kong for Hong Kong Rangers.

In December 2013, Lee moved to Penang FA after impressed in a trial match against Kelantan FA. Lee made his debut on 21 January 2014 against Sarawak FA in the Malaysia FA Cup. He made his league debut in a 3–1 home win over Sabah FA on 24 January. Lee scored his first league goal against UiTM FC on 7 February. Overall, he scored 15 league goals but failed to help Penang earn promotion to Malaysia Super League. He also scored twice in 2014 Malaysia Cup campaign.

In 2016, Lee signed with Malaysia Premier League club Sime Darby.

In January 2017, he joined Biu Chun Glory Sky.

Sabah 
In May 2017, Lee signed to Malaysian side Sabah. He made his debut against Kuantan and scored his first goal for Sabah. On 30 June 2017, Sabah also obtained three points in a 1–0 win over Royal Malaysian Police PDRM at the Hang Jebat Stadium in Melaka. Lee scored the winning goal in the 77th minute of match.

International career
Lee received his first call up to the South Korea under-20 side in 2003.

Statistics

Honours

Club
Suwon Samsung Bluewings
 K League: Runner-up 2006
 Korean FA Cup: Runner-up 2006

Busan IPark
 Korean League Cup: Runner-up 2011

Penang FA
 Malaysia Premier League: Runner-up 2015

References

Korean FA Cup match result 

1983 births
Living people
Association football midfielders
South Korean footballers
Suwon Samsung Bluewings players
Gimcheon Sangmu FC players
Busan IPark players
Shenyang Dongjin players
Guizhou F.C. players
China League One players
K League 1 players
South Korean expatriate sportspeople in China
Expatriate footballers in China
Hong Kong First Division League players
South Korean expatriates in Hong Kong
Expatriate footballers in Hong Kong
Korea University alumni
Expatriate footballers in Malaysia
Penang F.C. players